Luke Johnson (November 3, 1807 – December 9, 1861) was a leader in the Latter Day Saint movement and an original member of the Quorum of the Twelve Apostles from 1835 to 1838. He served in the Quorum with his younger brother, Lyman E. Johnson, and Orson Hyde, his brother-in-law.

Johnson was born November 3, 1807, in Pomfret, Vermont, a son of John Johnson and Elsa Jacobs. He wrote of his family in an autobiographical sketch:

Johnson was an educator and a physician. He married Susan H. Poteet on November 1, 1833. This marriage produced six children: Elisa Mary, Fanny, Eliza, Vashtia, James, and Solomon. After Susan's death on September 20, 1846, he married America Morgan Clark on March 3, 1847, in Council Bluffs, Iowa, and had additional children. This family included Susan Marinda, Orson Albert, Mark Anthony, Charlotte Elizabeth, Lovinia Ann, Phebe W. and Luke.

Church membership and service

Johnson was baptized into the Church of Christ on May 10, 1831, by Joseph Smith. By October 1831, he had been ordained an elder and went on a mission to southern Ohio with Robert Rathburn. Later in 1831, he joined Sidney Rigdon in preaching the gospel in areas of Pennsylvania and Ohio. Their efforts brought about fifty new members into the young church, including Rigdon's mother and other members of the Rigdon family. At one point, while he was praying, he had a vision of both the Angel Moroni and the golden plates.

Johnson was ordained to the office of high priest by Smith on October 25, 1831. With Seymour Brunson and Hazen Aldrich, he served as a missionary in Ohio, Virginia, and Kentucky in 1832 and 1833, baptizing more than a hundred people on their journey. He was a member of the Kirtland high council which was formed on February 17, 1834. On June 26, 1834, Johnson marched with Zion's Camp, suffering with cholera on the journey. At age 27, Johnson was chosen and ordained one of the original members of the Quorum of Twelve Apostles on February 15, 1835. Shortly after the quorum was formed, the new apostles were sent on missions. Johnson served in the Eastern United States, New York and Upper Canada. He returned to Kirtland, Ohio, in late 1836. There, he attended Hebrew school and the Kirtland Temple.

Johnson defended Smith from criticism on several occasions. But, in 1837, he became alienated from Smith, in part because of financial losses suffered in the failure of the Kirtland Safety Society. He was disfellowshipped at Kirtland on September 3, 1837. Johnson was later received back into fellowship for a short time, but in December 1837, he denounced Smith and resigned from the church. After leaving the church, Johnson moved to Cabell County, Virginia, where he taught at Marshall Academy and then studied medicine, ultimately setting up a medical practice in Kirtland. The church excommunicated Johnson in 1838 on charges of apostasy.

In 1846, after the death of Smith, Johnson requested permission to address an assembly of the saints in Nauvoo, Illinois. He said: "I have stopped by the wayside and stood aloof from the work of the Lord .... But my heart is with this people. I want to be associated with the saints, go with them into the wilderness and continue with them to the end." Johnson's brother-in-law, Orson Hyde, rebaptized him into the Church of Jesus Christ of Latter-day Saints on March 8, 1846. However, he never again served in the higher councils of the church.

Johnson traveled with Brigham Young and Wilford Woodruff to the Salt Lake Valley, serving as a captain of ten, as part of the first group of 143 Mormon pioneers in July 1847. He also served as a Captain of Fifty in the Daniel A. Miller/John W. Cooley Company (1853), while traveling with members of his family. Johnson settled in St. John, Tooele County, Utah, where he served as bishop of a local LDS congregation. He is the only man in the church's history who served as a bishop after being a member of the Quorum of the Twelve Apostles. He died December 9, 1861, in the home of Orson Hyde in Salt Lake City and was buried at Salt Lake City Cemetery.

Notes

References
 .
 Jenson, Andrew. editor. Latter-day Saint Biographical Encyclopedia; vol. 1 and vol. 4.
 Ludlow, Daniel H., A Companion to Your Study of the Doctrine and Covenants, Deseret Book Co., Salt Lake City, Utah, 1978. .

External links
 Luke S. Johnson diary, L. Tom Perry Special Collections, Harold B. Lee Library, Brigham Young University
Raymond P. Draper research papers, L. Tom Perry Special Collections, Harold B. Lee Library, Brigham Young University
Grampa Bill's G.A. Pages: Luke Johnson
 The John and Alice Johnson Family

1807 births
1861 deaths
American Latter Day Saint missionaries
American general authorities (LDS Church)
Angelic visionaries
Apostles of the Church of Christ (Latter Day Saints)
Burials at Salt Lake City Cemetery
Converts to Mormonism
Doctrine and Covenants people
Latter Day Saint missionaries in Canada
Latter Day Saint missionaries in the United States
Latter Day Saints from Illinois
Latter Day Saints from Ohio
Latter Day Saints from Utah
Latter Day Saints from Vermont
Latter Day Saints from Virginia
Mormon pioneers
People excommunicated by the Church of Christ (Latter Day Saints)
People from Pomfret, Vermont
People from Portage County, Ohio
People from Tooele County, Utah
Religious leaders from Vermont
Harold B. Lee Library-related 19th century articles